Athens Township may refer to:
Athens Township, Bradford County, Pennsylvania
Athens Township, Crawford County, Pennsylvania

Pennsylvania township disambiguation pages

de:Athens Township